The 1932 All-Pro Team consisted of American football players chosen by various selectors for the All-Pro team of the National Football League (NFL) for the 1932 NFL season. Teams were selected by, among others, seven of the eight NFL coaches for the United Press, Collyer's Eye (CE), and the Green Bay Press-Gazette. 

Five players were selected for the first team by all three selectors: Portsmouth Spartans quarterback Dutch Clark; Chicago Bears fullback Bronko Nagurski; New York Giants end Ray Flaherty; Green Bay Packers tackle Cal Hubbard; and Chicago Bears guard Zuck Carlson.

Team

References

All-Pro Teams
1932 National Football League season